CD30+ cutaneous T-cell lymphoma, also known as primary cutaneous anaplastic large cell lymphoma, is a cutaneous (skin) condition characterized by solitary or localized skin lesions that have a tendency to ulcerate.

See also 
 Cutaneous T-cell lymphoma
 Secondary cutaneous CD30+ large cell lymphoma
 List of cutaneous conditions

References

External links

Lymphoid-related cutaneous conditions
Lymphoma